The wushu (taolu) competition at the 2022 World Games took place in July 2022, in Birmingham, Alabama, at the Bill Battle Coliseum. Originally scheduled to take place in July 2021, the Games were rescheduled for July 2022 as a result of the 2020 Summer Olympics postponement due to the COVID-19 pandemic.

Wushu featured as an invitational sport alongside duathlon, flag football, lacrosse, and wheelchair rugby. Wushu was also an invitational sport at the World Games in 2009 and 2013. In May 2021, the International Wushu Federation was admitted into the International World Games Association and wushu will be considered as a potential official event in the 2025 World Games.

Qualification 

Qualification was done according to the results of the 2019 World Wushu Championships in Shanghai. This is a taolu exclusive competition and so no sanda events took place compared to previous renditions. There were five events for male and female athletes which included: changquan, daoshu/gunshu combined, jianshu/qiangshu combined, nanquan/nangun combined (for men), nanquan/nandao combined (for women), and taijiquan/taijijian combined. The qualification list was later revised in February 2022 due to Macau's IOC ineligibility to compete and the start of the Russian invasion of Ukraine, and thus eight new spots were opened.

Participating nations

Medal table

Events

Men

Women

Results

Men's changquan

Men's daoshu & gunshu combined

Men's jianshu & qiangshu combined

Men's nanquan & nangun combined

Men's taijiquan & taijijian combined

Women's changquan

Women's daoshu & gunshu combined

Women's jianshu & qiangshu combined

Women's nanquan & nandao combined

Women's taijiquan & taijijian combined

References

External links 
 Official website
 Results book

Wushu in the United States
2022 World Games
Wushu at the World Games
Wushu competitions in the United States
2022 in wushu (sport)